María Paz Monserrat Blasco (24 January 1956 - 29 November 2015) was a Spanish paralympic athlete.

She competed in para swimming and won three medals at the 1992 Summer Paralympic Games, in Barcelona.

Career 
At the 1992 Summer Paralympics, she won a silver medal in Women's 50 m Freestyle S3-4, silver medal in Women's 50 m Backstroke S3-4, and bronze medal in Women's 100 m Freestyle S3-4.

References 

1956 births
2015 deaths
Sportspeople from Zaragoza
Paralympic swimmers of Spain
S4-classified Paralympic swimmers
Spanish female freestyle swimmers
Spanish female backstroke swimmers
Swimmers at the 1992 Summer Paralympics
Medalists at the 1992 Summer Paralympics
Paralympic silver medalists for Spain
Paralympic bronze medalists for Spain